Wouter Leefers (born 12 January 1953) is a retired field hockey player from the Netherlands. He competed at the 1972 and 1976 Olympics, where his teams finished in fourth place on both occasions. He missed the 1980 Games which were boycotted by the Dutch Hockey Federation.

Between 1971 and 1982 Leefers played 156 international matches and scored 28 goals. He competed at the 1971, 1973, 1975, 1978 and 1982 World Cups and won a gold medal in 1973 and a silver in 1978.

References

External links
 

1953 births
Living people
Dutch male field hockey players
Olympic field hockey players of the Netherlands
Field hockey players at the 1972 Summer Olympics
Field hockey players at the 1976 Summer Olympics
Field hockey players from The Hague
HGC players
1978 Men's Hockey World Cup players
20th-century Dutch people
21st-century Dutch people